Euphorbia lomelii is a perennial succulent plant native to Sonora, Mexico. Formerly called Pedilanthus macrocarpus Benth. Its common names include slipper plant, ladies slipper and gallito.

References

lomelii
Flora of Sonora